Juho Ville Matias Hänninen (born 25 July 1981) is a Finnish rally driver. He is the 2010 Intercontinental Rally Challenge (IRC) champion and 2011 Super 2000 World Rally Championship (S-WRC) champion with co-driver Mikko Markkula driving a works entered Fabia S2000 for Red Bull Škoda. He also won the 2004 Group N Finnish Rally Championship title, and debuted in the World Rally Championship during the 2006 season.

Career
Hänninen who was born in Punkaharju debuted in the Finnish Rally Championship in 2003, finishing eighth overall in the Group n (small Group N) standings. The next year, he won the title in the same class at the wheel of a Honda Civic Type R. In 2005, he finished second in the Group N class with a Mitsubishi Lancer Evolution VI.

Hänninen's first World Rally Championship event was the 2006 Swedish Rally, where he won the Group N class in his Lancer Evolution IX, and placed 15th overall. At his next rally, the Rally d'Italia Sardegna, Hänninen was again the fastest Group N driver and finished 14th overall. He competed in three more WRC events during the 2006 season, and achieved his best overall result at the Rally New Zealand, where he was ninth and second in the Group N class after Jari-Matti Latvala. In his debut in a World Rally Car in Finland, Hänninen was excluded for not wearing the correct fireproof underwear. At the season-ending Rally GB, Hänninen competed in a Super 1600 -class Citroën C2 and finished 19th overall, ahead of all the Junior World Rally Championship contestants.

In the 2007 season, Hänninen did a full six-event Production World Rally Championship (PWRC) programme in the Lancer Evolution IX. He initially won the Swedish Rally but was later disqualified for non-homologated fuel pumps. His best results then were a second place at the Rally GB and a third place in Argentina, and he placed fifth in the championship standings. He also competed in three World Rally Championship events in a Mitsubishi Lancer WRC05, taking his first WRC point by finishing eighth at the Rally d'Italia Sardegna.

In 2008, Hänninen is contesting the PWRC for the Ralliart New Zealand team. He won the Swedish Rally, also finishing eighth overall and taking his second WRC point, and the Rally Finland. He has also competed in two (IRC) events, taking fifth place with the Group N Lancer Evolution IX at the Rally Portugal and then winning his first rally in a Super 2000 car at the Rally Russia in a Peugeot 207 S2000.

In 2009, Hänninen contested the IRC for Škoda in a Škoda Fabia S2000, winning in Russia for the second year in succession and finishing sixth in the championship. Hänninen continued his relation with Škoda for the 2010 season. He became IRC champion after winning the 2010 Rally Scotland. He scored 3 wins, four 2nd places and three 3rd places and 62 points. Hänninen won Rally Argentina, Rally d´Italia Sardegna and Rally Scotland. Also as in 2009, Hänninen competed in 2010 Rally Finland driving a Škoda Fabia for the Red Bull Rally Team, winning the S-WRC class.
 
For 2011, Hänninen competed in both IRC and S-WRC, driving for the Red Bull Škoda team in the S-WRC. He became the S-WRC champion after winning the Rally Catalunya.

He took his first ever stage win in the World Rally Championship at the 2013 Monte Carlo Rally, setting the fastest time on stage nine. On 8 July, Hyundai confirmed that it had signed Hänninen as an official test driver to develop the Hyundai i20 WRC.

Results

WRC results

As driver

As co-driver

PWRC results

SWRC results

IRC results

ERC results

Notes

References

External links

Official website
Hänninen at eWRC
Hänninen at RallyBase
 

1981 births
European Rally Championship drivers
Finnish rally drivers
Intercontinental Rally Challenge drivers
Living people
People from Punkaharju
World Rally Championship drivers
Sportspeople from South Savo
Toyota Gazoo Racing drivers
Hyundai Motorsport drivers
Škoda Motorsport drivers